Ptolemy, the Greco-Egyptian geographer of Alexandria, wrote about a "Stone Tower" (λίθινος πύργος in Greek, Turris Lapidea in Latin) which marked the midpoint on the ancient Silk Road – the network of overland trade routes taken by caravans between Europe and Asia.  It was the most important landmark on this route, where caravans stopped on their difficult and dangerous journeys to allow travelers to take on provisions, rest, and trade goods before continuing on.

Ptolemy's famous treatise on cartography, Geography, written around 140 CE, is the only book on this subject to have survived from classical antiquity, and has had a profound influence right through the ages. In it, he set the coordinates of the Stone Tower at longitude 135 and latitude 43 degrees north on his gradation system, but its actual location has been vigorously debated by researchers and historians over the centuries. This is because the information that he, and other scholars from his era, left behind is simply not precise enough (despite his coordinates), due to the rudimentary methods caravans employed while route surveying distant lands from which ancient cartographers drew their maps. If the Stone Tower could be pin-pointed then not only would this be of great significance in the study of ancient geography, but it would allow other important landmarks in this region, similarly (and imprecisely) detailed by Ptolemy, to be more closely located also. Identifying an actual location for this site would allow archaeological work to be more targeted as well, increasing the chance of successful excavations.

A brief survey of literature reveals the long-standing disagreements by geographers and historians to locate the Stone Tower: As far back as the 11th century Al-Biruni suggested it was the city of Tashkent (which means “castle of stone”). In the 19th century, Hagar too maintained it was Tashkent, partly based on the striking coincidence of the city being on supposedly the same latitude of 43 degrees north (in fact it is 41.2 degrees north); while Jean Baptiste Bourguignon d'Anville identified it with the fortress of Aatas, 7 degrees northwest of Kashgar; and James Bell argued it was near the Pass of Chiltung in the Pamirs. Henry Yule located it nearby at Daraut-Kurgan, while William Bevan & William Smith thought the Stone Tower was probably the same as the "Hormeterium" (or “merchants' station” which Ptolemy also writes about) and located it near the Sulaiman-Too mountain in Osh. Edward Bunbury thought the information given was too vague to precisely determine its location.

In the 20th century, Joseph Hackin travelled there and thought it was at Tashkurgan, while Albert Herrmann placed it in the vicinity of Daraut-Kurgan. Aurel Stein, who perhaps most extensively travelled this region, suggested the valley of Karategin was the area Ptolemy referred to “when the traveller ascended the ravine” and so proposed a site near Daraut-Kurgan, and J. Oliver Thomson agrees it should be nearby.

From the turn of this century, Claude Rapin (2001) has suggested it is Sulaiman-Too; while Paul Bernard (2005), by carefully tracing the route taken by the caravan of Maes Titianos, locates the Stone Tower near Daraut-Kurgan; and Igor Vasilevich Piankov (2014), after also considering information drawn from contemporary sailors, agrees with him. Irina Tupikova et al. (2014), following “the application of spherical trigonometry for the recalculation of Ptolemy’s coordinates”, concluded that it “can with great probability be identified as Tashkurgan”. Riaz Dean (2022) also uses a new methodology, by proposing a set of four criteria, and three additional reasons based on historical considerations, to locate this landmark, and identifies it as Sulaiman-Too.

All in all, there are four sites that are most often identified as the likely location of the Stone Tower:  (i) the city of Tashkent, in Uzbekistan; (ii) the Sulaiman-Too mountain in Osh, Kyrgyzstan; (iii) the town of Daraut-Kurgan in south-western Kyrgyzstan; and (iv) the town of Tashkurgan, in Xinjiang, China. Some historians also consider the "Hormeterium" which Ptolemy mentioned to be one and the same as the Stone Tower, and believe this landmark to be the settlement of Irkeshtam (however, Ptolemy specifically states in his Geography that this station lay 5 degrees further east).

All four sites mentioned above, as well as Irkeshtam, can be seen on the Map of Silk Roads over the Roof of Asia and on Map 4 in The Stone Tower: Ptolemy, the Silk Road, and a 2,000-year-old Riddle.

References 

Sites along the Silk Road